Sir Chettur Sankaran Nair, CIE (11 July 1857 – 24 April 1934) was a lawyer who also served as a President of the Indian National Congress in 1897 at the meeting held at Amravati. He wrote Gandhi and Anarchy (1922).

Early life and education
Chettur Sankaran Nair was born on 11 July 1857 in a Hindu Nair aristocratic family of Mammayil Ramunni Panicker and Parvathy Amma Chettur in Mankara, Palakkad district. His early education began in the traditional style at home and continued in schools in Malabar, till he passed the arts examination with a first class from the Provincial School at Calicut. Then he joined the Presidency College, Madras. In 1877 he took his arts degree, and two years later secured the law degree from the Madras Law College.

Career
Nair started as a lawyer in 1880 in the High Court of Madras. In 1884, the Madras Government appointed him as a member of the committee for an enquiry into the district of Malabar. Till 1908, he was the Advocate-General to the Government and an Acting Judge from time to time. In 1908, he became a permanent Judge in the High Court of Madras and held the post till 1915. He was a part of the bench that tried Collector Ashe murder case along with C. A. White, then the Chief Justice of Madras, William Ayling, as a special case.

In the meantime, in 1902, the Viceroy Lord Curzon appointed him Secretary to the Raleigh University Commission. In recognition of his services, he was appointed a Companion of the Indian Empire by the King-Emperor in 1904 and in 1912 he was knighted. He became a member of the Viceroy's Council in 1915 with the charge of the Education portfolio. As member, he wrote in 1919 two famous Minutes of Dissent in the Despatches on Indian Constitutional Reforms, pointing out the various defects of British rule in India and suggesting reforms. For an Indian to offer such criticism and make such demands was incredible in those days. The British government accepted most of his recommendations. Nair resigned from the Viceroy's Council in the aftermath of Jalianwalabagh massacre on 13 April 1919.

He played an active part in the Indian National movement which was gathering force in those days. In 1897, when the First Provincial Conference met in Madras, he was invited to preside over it. The same year, when the Indian National Congress assembled at Amaravathi, he was chosen its president. In a masterly address, he referred to the highhandedness of foreign administration, called for reforms and asked for self-government for India with Dominion Status. In 1900, he was a member of the Madras Legislative Council. His official life from 1908 to 1921 interrupted his activities as a free political worker. In 1928, he was the President of the Indian Central Committee to co-operate with the Simon Commission. The Committee prepared a well-argued report asking for Dominion Status for India. When the Viceregal announcement came granting Dominion Status as the ultimate goal for India, Sir Sankaran Nair retired from active politics. He died in 1934, aged 77.

Family

Nair was married to his maternal cousin (uncle's daughter) Palat Kunhimalu Amma a.k.a. Lady Sankaran Nair according to the then-existed customs at a young age. She predecased him in 1926, during a pilgrimage to the holy temple of Badrinath in the present-day Uttarakhand. Their eldest daughter Lady Madhavan Nair and son-in-law and nephew Sir C. Madhavan Nair (a legal luminary and a judge of the Privy Council) lived on a large estate known as Lynwood, in Chennai. Within this property, in the area now known as Lady Madhavan Nair colony/Mahalinagapuram, is situated near the Ayappan-Guruvayoorappan temple, the land for which was donated by Lady Madhavan Nair. There are still many roads bearing names of the house – Lynwood avenue – and of the children of Sir and Lady Nair – Palat Narayani Amma road, Palat Sankaran Nair road, Palat Madhavan Nair road. 

Nair also had five more children, among which another daughter - Saraswathy Amma a.k.a. Anuji - was married to the eminent diplomat K. P. S. Menon. Their son, Nair's grandson, also called K.P.S. Menon, and great-grandson Shivshankar Menon were also diplomats who served as Foreign Secretary. Shivshankar Menon also served as India's 4th National Security Advisor.

Nair's son R. M. Palat was also a noted politician by himself.

Lieutenant General KP Candeth, the Western Army Commander during the Indo-Pak War of 1971 and the liberator of Goa, was another of Sir Sankaran Nair's grandsons.

His nephew, V. M. M. Nair, was the oldest surviving ICS Officer in India when he died in 2021.

Sankaran Nair's grand-nephew (niece Ammukutty Amma's son) was K. K. Chettur, an ICS officer who also served as India's first ambassador to Japan. He was the father of Jaya Jaitly, a politician and socialist, whose husband Ashok Jaitly was chief secretary of Jammu and Kashmir.  Jaya's daughter Aditi is married to the former cricketer Ajay Jadeja.

Another grand-nephew of Sankaran Nair's was P.P. Narayanan (son of Chettur Narayanan Nair), a distinguished world trade unionist and leader in Malaysia (Morais 1984, introductory pages).

References

Bibliography 
 Gandhi and Anarchy (1922). Archive.org. Retrieved on 2012-06-11.

Presidents of the Indian National Congress
1857 births
1934 deaths
Companions of the Order of the Indian Empire
Knights Bachelor
Indian Knights Bachelor
Presidency College, Chennai alumni
Malayali people
People from Kerala
Advocates General for Tamil Nadu
Members of the Imperial Legislative Council of India
Members of the Madras Legislative Council
Members of the Council of the Governor General of India